Gray is a hamlet in the Canadian province of Saskatchewan. Gray is about 40 km southeast of Regina.

Demographics 

References

External links
Community website

Designated places in Saskatchewan
Lajord No. 128, Saskatchewan
Organized hamlets in Saskatchewan
Division No. 6, Saskatchewan